William Robert Ramsay Armitage   (April 2, 1889 – April 12, 1984) was a Canadian Anglican priest. He was Dean of New Westminster from 1929 to 1940.

Armitage was educated at the University of Toronto and ordained in 1914. After a curacy at the Church of the Messiah, Toronto, he was a chaplain to the Canadian Armed Forces during World War I, 3rd Battalion, Royal Regiment of Canada. He was awarded the Military Cross in the 1919 Birthday Honours for Bravery under fire rescuing wounded from the battlefield at Vimy Ridge, France. When peace returned he went back to his parish, becoming vicar in 1921. He stayed here until his appointment as dean. In 1940 he became Principal of Wycliffe College, Toronto: a professorship there is named in his honour.

References

1889 births
1984 deaths
University of Toronto alumni
Canadian Anglican priests
Deans of New Westminster
Academic staff of the University of Toronto
Canadian recipients of the Military Cross
Canadian military chaplains